Radiocarbon is a scientific journal devoted to the topic of radiocarbon dating.

It was founded in 1959 as a supplement to the American Journal of Science, and is an important source of data and information about radiocarbon dating.  It publishes many radiocarbon results, and since 1979 it has published the proceedings of the international conferences on radiocarbon dating.  The journal is published six times per year. As of 2016, it is published by Cambridge University Press.

See also
 Carbon-14

References

External links

Radiocarbon at the University of Arizona
Radiocarbon archives (1959-2012) at the University of Arizona Campus Repository

Radiocarbon dating
Publications established in 1959
Cambridge University Press academic journals
Bimonthly journals
University of Arizona